Maloternovoy is a rural locality (a khutor) in Bolsheternovskoye Rural Settlement, Chernyshkovsky District, Volgograd Oblast, Russia. The population was 264 as of 2010. There are 4 streets.

Geography 
Maloternovoy is located on the Don plain in southwest of Vologda Oblast, 23 km northeast of Chernyshkovsky (the district's administrative centre) by road. Bolsheternovoy is the nearest rural locality.

References 

Rural localities in Chernyshkovsky District